Curtis Johnson, Jr. (born November 5, 1961) is an American football coach who is the head coach for the Houston Gamblers of the United States Football League (USFL). He was the head coach at Tulane University from 2012 to 2015.

Coaching career

Early years 
After graduating from the University of Idaho, Johnson first became a wide receivers coach at Lewiston High School in Lewiston, Idaho before taking his first college assistant job for Idaho in 1987.  In the series of assistant jobs that followed, Johnson developed a reputation as an outstanding recruiter as well as position coach.  At San Diego State, he recruited future Pro Football Hall of Fame running back Marshall Faulk (like him, a native New Orleanian), as well as wide receiver Darnay Scott.  After San Diego State, Johnson spent single seasons at Southern Methodist University, and at the University of California (where he coached future All-American Bobby Shaw, among others), before taking a position at Miami in 1996.

Miami
Johnson spent the next decade at Miami.  As part of a staff that went to nine bowl games and won the 2001 National Championship, Johnson coached Andre Johnson, Santana Moss, and Reggie Wayne.  He was also credited with recruiting standout safety Ed Reed, another native New Orleanian.

New Orleans Saints
Johnson was a member of Sean Payton's original Saints coaching staff.  In his time there, he coached wide receivers Marques Colston, Devery Henderson, Robert Meachem, and Lance Moore, among others.  From 2006–11, his wideouts combined for 108 touchdown grabs and 35 performances with over 100 yards receiving.  He was part of the coaching staff for the team that won Super Bowl XLIV in the 2009 season.

Chicago Bears
On February 15, 2016, Johnson was hired by the Bears as wide receivers coach to replace Mike Groh, who left for the same position with the Los Angeles Rams.  After the season, he turned down an offer to remain with the Bears and left the team on January 30, 2017.

New Orleans Saints
He rejoined the Saints in 2017 as a senior offensive assistant and in 2021 added the additional title of wide receivers coach.

Tulane
On December 5, 2011, Johnson was named the new head coach of the Tulane Green Wave football team, replacing outgoing coach Bob Toledo.  Johnson finished the NFL season with the Saints while simultaneously taking over the program at Tulane.

On November 28, 2015, Johnson was relieved of his duties as Tulane's head coach. After beginning the 2013 season 6–2, Johnson would go on to lose 22 of his final 27 games against Football Bowl Subdivision opponents. He finished at Tulane with a 15–34 record through four full seasons. He compiled a 7–9 conference record in the C-USA (2012 and 2013), and a 3–13 conference record in the American Athletic Conference (2014 and 2015).

Upon Johnson's dismissal, Tulane Athletic Director Rick Dickson said "I want to thank CJ for his hard work and his dedication to rebuilding the Green Wave football program. His efforts were rewarded in 2013 when Tulane reached its first bowl in 11 years. Since then, however, the program has not progressed to the level that we aspire to."

Houston Gamblers 
On February 15, 2023, Johnson was hired by the Houston Gamblers of the United States Football League (USFL) as their next head coach for the 2023 season.

Personal life
Johnson was born in New Orleans and grew up in St. Rose, Louisiana, where his father was a St. Charles Parish councilman. He attended St. Charles Catholic High School in LaPlace, Louisiana. He was honored by his high school's community with an exhibit hosted by the St. Charles Museum and Historical Association and the River Road Historical Society in 2010. After high school, at the University of Idaho, Johnson played college football, ran track and field, and graduated with a Bachelor of Science in Physical Education.  He and his wife Angel live in Harvey and have six children.  Johnson is a deacon at his church, and has travelled to schools and camps promoting academic success, hard work and faith.

One of his sons, Curtis "Trey" Johnson III played wide receiver for the University of Memphis.

Head coaching record

College

USFL

References

External links

 Tulane profile
 New Orleans Saints profile

1961 births
Living people
People from St. Rose, Louisiana
American football wide receivers
California Golden Bears football coaches
Idaho Vandals football coaches
Idaho Vandals football players
Miami Hurricanes football coaches
New Orleans Saints coaches
San Diego State Aztecs football coaches
SMU Mustangs football coaches
Tulane Green Wave football coaches
Players of American football from New Orleans
African-American coaches of American football
African-American players of American football
People from Harvey, Louisiana
21st-century African-American people
20th-century African-American sportspeople